The Lindekemale watermill (French: Le moulin de Lindekemale, Dutch: De Lindekemalemolen) is a 12th-century watermill at the north side of the Park Malou in Brussels, Belgium, currently operating as a restaurant.

Situation 

The building of the mill is located on the northern fringes of the Malou Park, in the Woluwe St Lambert municipality of Brussels. The water wheel was operated by the nearby Woluwe river.

History 

According to the official site of the Woluwe St Lambert municipality, the Lindekemale watermill was first mentioned in 1129, which effectively makes it the oldest known watermill still existing in the Brussels area. At this time the watermill was the property of the feudal overlords of the Woluwe area, who effectively ceded it to the norbertine abbey of Park (which is situated close to present-day Leuven).

The mill originally was used to process grains such as wheat but from the 19th century was also used to process paper.

One of the famous owners of the mill is Jean Devis, the longest-serving mayor of the Woluwe St Lambert municipality (between 1819-1860).

Since 1955, the mill has been owned by the community. The building is a classified and protected building since 1989.

References 

Buildings and structures in Brussels
Watermills in Belgium
Woluwe-Saint-Lambert